The Walpole ministry was led by Whig Prime Minister Robert Walpole, 1st Earl of Orford, from 1730 to 1742—when Walpole left the government.

Ministry

See also
 1734 British general election
 1741 British general election
 1742 vote of no confidence in the Walpole ministry

Notes

References

 
 
 

British ministries
Government
1730 establishments in Great Britain
1742 disestablishments in Great Britain
1730s in Great Britain
1740s in Great Britain
Robert Walpole
Ministries of George II of Great Britain